Davanagere North Assembly constituency is one of the 224 Legislative Assembly constituencies of Karnataka state in India.

It is part of Davanagere district.

Members of the Legislative Assembly 
Source

Election results

2018

See also
 List of constituencies of the Karnataka Legislative Assembly
 Davanagere district

References

Davanagere district
Assembly constituencies of Karnataka